The 2014 Dunlop MSA British Touring Car Championship was a multi-event motor racing championship for production-based touring cars held across England and Scotland. The championship features a mix of professional motor racing teams and privately funded amateur drivers competing in highly modified versions of Family cars which are sold to the general public and conform to the technical regulations for the championship. It is one of the most popular domestic motor racing series in the United Kingdom, with an extensive program of support categories built up around the BTCC centrepiece. It was the 57th British Touring Car Championship (BTCC) season.

It was the fourth season that cars conforming to the Next Generation Touring Car (NGTC) specification competed in, and the first season that S2000 specification cars did not contest since their introduction to the BTCC in 2004. The Jack Sears Trophy, which was introduced in 2013 for the top S2000 finisher over the duration of the season, was awarded to the Independent driver who achieves the greatest improvement from their respective grid positions over the entire season. The start and finishing positions of all Independent drivers will be logged for all 30 races and the driver with the highest total number of positions gained over the season will become the Jack Sears Trophy champion.

Teams and drivers

Driver changes
 Changed teams
 James Cole drove United Autosports having left Team HARD. midway through the 2013 season.
 Following on from sporadic appearances in the championship in 2012 and 2013 racing for Team HARD, Robb Holland entered the championship full-time in 2014 for Rotek Racing in an Audi S3 Saloon.
 Ollie Jackson left Speedworks Motorsport to race a second Proton Persona prepared by Welch Motorsport.
 Aiden Moffat contested a full season with a Chevrolet Cruze purchased from Andy Neate having contested a handful of rounds in 2013 for Team HARD.
 Dave Newsham switched from Speedworks Motorsport to AmD Tuning.com.
 Árón Smith switched from Airwaves Racing to Team BMR.

 Entering/re-entering BTCC
 Double Renault UK Clio Cup ‘Masters Cup’ Champion Simon Belcher graduated to the BTCC in a Handy Motorsport run Toyota Avensis with assistance from Speedworks Motorsport.
 Having last entered the championship in 2010 driving for Forster Motorsport, Martin Depper drove the second Pirtek Racing Honda Civic in 2014.
 2013 European Supercar Challenge Championship champion Glynn Geddie will entered the series for United Autosports.
 1999 British Formula 3 Champion and Head of Driver Development at Marussia F1 Marc Hynes entered the BTCC in a works prepared MG6 GT run by Triple Eight Race Engineering but separate from their 'main' MG KX Clubcard Fuel Save factory team.
 1997 and 2000 BTCC champion Alain Menu returned to the series with Team BMR.
 2007 and 2008 BTCC champion Fabrizio Giovanardi returned to the series with Airwaves Racing.

 Leaving BTCC
 Jeff Smith left the BTCC after four seasons in order to focus on other commitments.
 Frank Wrathall left the series after being sent to prison for 21 months due to pleading guilty to causing death by careless driving on 7 February 2014. Dynojet's assets had already been sold to United Autosports.
 Andy Neate decided not to return to the BTCC in 2014 having sold his Cruze to Aiden Moffat at the end of the 2013 season. Neate is focused on a return in 2015.
 Tom Onslow-Cole left the series to go and do other things, eventually driving in British GT, but stated intent to return after claiming he had 'unfinished business' in the series.

Team changes
 Ciceley Racing changed from their ex-Dynojet NGTC Toyota Avensis to a brand new, self built, NGTC Mercedes-Benz A-Class for Adam Morgan. This will be the first time for the Mercedes-Benz marque in the BTCC since 1986.
 Honda Yuasa Racing Team built Honda Civic Tourers in 2014. This marks the first time that an estate car has been run in the BTCC since 1994.
 Rotek Racing with help from Tony Gilham Racing entered the series with an Audi A3 for Robb Holland.
 Welch Motorsport built a second Proton with a more competent engine for the 2014 season.
 United Autosports entered the series with two Toyota Avensis's purchased from the Dynojet team.
 AmD Tuning.com contested the 2014 season with a Ford Focus ST Mk.III purchased from Motorbase Performance despite initial intentions to build a NGTC specification Vauxhall Astra for the 2013 season.

Race calendar
The provisional calendar was announced by the championship organisers on 14 September 2013. The Oulton Park round will switch from the Island layout to the International circuit, which was last used during the 1996 season. All races were held in the United Kingdom.

Results

Championship standings

Drivers' Championship
(key)

Manufacturers'/Constructors' Championship
 
MG won the Manufacturer's Championship in 2014, just three years after returning to the British Touring Car Championship. 
The MG/Triple Eight team ended Honda's four year dominance of the sport after securing 7 wins and 20 podiums throughout the season.

Teams' Championship

Independents' Trophy

Independent Teams' Trophy

Jack Sears Trophy
After its introduction in 2013, the Jack Sears Trophy will now be awarded to the independent driver who makes up the most places over the course of the 2014 season. Any drivers who are penalised at a meeting will not accrue points towards the Trophy.

Footnotes

References

External links

TouringCarTimes

British Touring Car Championship seasons
Touring Car Championship